So Near, Yet So Far is a 1912 American silent drama film directed by  D. W. Griffith. Prints of the film survive in the Museum of Modern Art film archive.

Cast
 Walter Miller as Howard
 Mary Pickford as The Young Woman
 Robert Harron as The Rival/In Club
 Lionel Barrymore as In Club
 Elmer Booth as A Thief
 W. Christy Cabanne as In Club/On Street
 Harry Carey as A Thief
 Courtenay Foote as In Club
 Florence Geneva as On Street
 Dorothy Gish as A Friend
 Lillian Gish as A Friend
 Adolph Lestina as In Club
 Charles Hill Mailes as Rich Man in Other Town
 Claire McDowell as Rich Woman in Other Town
 Antonio Moreno as In Club
 Gus Pixley as In Club
 W. C. Robinson as In Club
 Henry B. Walthall
 J. Waltham as In Club
 L. M. Wells as The Young Woman's Father (unconfirmed)

See also
 Harry Carey filmography
 D. W. Griffith filmography
 Lillian Gish filmography
 Lionel Barrymore filmography

References

External links

1912 films
Films directed by D. W. Griffith
American silent short films
American black-and-white films
1912 drama films
1912 short films
Silent American drama films
1910s American films